The University of Maiduguri (UNIMAID) is a Federal higher institution located in Maiduguri, the capital city of Borno State in Northeast Nigeria. The university was created by the federal government of Nigeria in 1975, with the intention of its becoming one of the country's principal higher-education institutions. It enrolls about 25,000 students in its combined programs, which include a college of medicine and faculties of agriculture, arts, environmental science, Allied health science, Basic medical science, dentistry, education, engineering, law, management science, pharmacy, science, social science, and veterinary medicine. With the encouragement of the federal government, the university has recently been increasing its research efforts, particularly in the fields of agriculture, medicine and conflict resolution, and expanding the university press. The university is the major higher institution of learning in the north-eastern part of the country.

Faculties (colleges) 
The university of Maiduguri has 12 faculties.

Affiliate institutions
The approved affiliate institutions of the University of Maiduguri, approved by the National Universities Commission (NUC) are as follows:
 Umar Ibn Ibrahim El-Kanemi College of Education, Science and Technology, Bama
 College of Education, Azare, Bauchi State
 College of Education, Gashua, Yobe State
 Federal College of Education (Technical), Gombe
Annahda college of science and Islamic 
Studies Diploma section
 Federal College of Education Yola

Notable alumni
 

Hadiza Sabuwa Balarabe Deputy Governor of Kaduna State
Abubakar Sani Bello Governor of Niger State
Umar Buba Bindir, Nigerian Agricultural engineer and incumbent Director-General of the National Office for Technology Acquisition and Promotion (NOTAP)
Imrana Alhaji Buba, Activist, Social entrepreneur, recipient of Queen's Young Leader Award
Lt-Gen Tukur Yusuf Buratai, former Chief of Army Staff, Nigeria
Sen Lawal Yahaya Gumau, Nigerian Politician
Professor Andrew Haruna, Nigerian academic, and Vice Chancellor of Federal University Gashua
Okezie Ikpeazu Governor of Abia State
Ibrahim Kpotun Idris, former Inspector General of Police, Nigeria
Orji Uzor Kalu, Former Governor of Abia State
Mele Kyari, Group Managing Director of Nigerian National Petroleum Corporation
Sen Ahmad Ibrahim Lawan, Senate President of Nigeria
Sen Bala Mohammed, Governor of Bauchi State
 Jude Rabo, vice-chancellor of Federal University, Wukari
Kashim Shettima, Vice President-elect of Nigeria, former Governor of Borno State
Aliyu Shugaba incumbent vice chancellor of University of Maiduguri
Danladi Umar, Nigerian Jurist
Professor Babagana Umara Zulum, Politician, Governor of Borno State

Terrorist attacks
In the early morning of January 16, 2017, there was a suicide bomb attack at a mosque at the University. The explosion killed four people, including Professor Aliyu Mani and one of the attackers, and wounding seventeen. The wounded were rushed to the University of Maiduguri Teaching Hospital. Another attacker, a girl approximately 12 years old, was reportedly shot by police as she approached the university, detonating her explosives and killing her. Responsibility for the attack was claimed by Boko Haram leader Abubakar Shekau. The number of attackers involved has varied between reports, but one of the bombers was believed to be a teenage girl.

Three suicide bombers attacked the University on June 25 and June 26, 2017, killing one security guard. The university has begun digging a 27 kilometer trench around the perimeter in order to prevent Boko Haram attacks.

References

External links
University of Maiduguri Official website

 
Maiduguri
Educational institutions established in 1975
Public universities in Nigeria
1975 establishments in Nigeria
Education in Borno State